Kayla Romaniuk (born 22 February 2002) is an Australian professional rugby league footballer who currently plays for the Newcastle Knights in the NRL Women's Premiership.

Background
Born in Kurri Kurri, New South Wales, Romaniuk played her junior rugby league for the Kurri Kurri Bulldogs. She also played basketball for the Maitland Mustangs growing up and represented the Country Women's side.

Playing career

Early years
In 2019, Romaniuk joined the Newcastle Knights, playing for their Tarsha Gale Cup side. On 25 November 2021, she signed a development contract with the Knights' NRL Women's Premiership side.

2022
In 2022, Romaniuk spent most of the year playing with the Knights' NSWRL Women's Premiership side. She was named in the extended squad for the Knights' round 5 2022 NRLW season clash with the St. George Illawarra Dragons, after having her contract upgraded to the top 24 squad.

On 2 October, Romaniuk played in the Knights' 2022 NRLW Grand Final win over the Parramatta Eels.

References

External links
Newcastle Knights profile

2002 births
Living people
Australian rugby league players
Newcastle Knights (NRLW) players
Kurri Kurri Bulldogs players
Rugby league locks
Rugby league props
Rugby league players from Kurri Kurri